Jean Card (born 1936), is a female former athlete who competed for England.

Athletics career
She represented England in the high jump at the 1958 British Empire and Commonwealth Games in Cardiff, Wales.

References

1936 births
English female high jumpers
Athletes (track and field) at the 1958 British Empire and Commonwealth Games
Living people
Place of birth missing (living people)
Commonwealth Games competitors for England